Physoptera is a genus of flies in the family Phoridae.

Species
P. apicinebula (Malloch, 1924)
P. membranosa (Borgmeier, 1925)
P. parastigmatica Borgmeier, 1966
P. parvitergata (Borgmeier, 1925)
P. pictiventris Borgmeier, 1958
P. pleurospinosa Borgmeier, 1961
P. poeciloptera Borgmeier, 1958
P. punctifemur (Enderlein, 1912)
P. rostralis Borgmeier, 1959
P. spatiosa Borgmeier, 1958
P. stigmatica Borgmeier, 1959
P. tarsata (Brues, 1905)
P. vesiculata (Borgmeier, 1925)

References

Phoridae
Platypezoidea genera